The 2000 ANFA Cup, marketed as ANFA Coca Cola Invitational Tournament, the twelfth version of the ANFA Cup, a knock-out football tournament organized by the All Nepal Football Association. All matches were played at the Dasarath Rangasala Stadium in Kathmandu. Six teams participated in the tournament.

Participating teams

  Nepal Red
  Nepal Blue
 
  Soongsil  
  Air Force Central F.C.     
  Bangladesh Army

Group stage

Group A

Group B

Bracket

Matches

Semi-finals

Final

Notes

See also
ANFA Cup

References 

ANFA Cup
2000 in Nepalese sport